John Harvey Combs was appointed to the Provincial Court of Manitoba in Brandon on March 27, 2003.

Judge Combs received his law degree from the University of Manitoba and was called to the bar in 1977.

He began his career with Legal Aid Manitoba and was a partner in the firm of Hunt, Miller, Combs. He is a life bencher of the Law Society of Manitoba and has chaired a number of committees for that organization.

Judge Combs has also been active in the community. He served on the boards of the Keystone Centre and McKenzie Seeds.

References
Government of Manitoba news release (accessed August 3, 2007)

Judges in Manitoba
University of Manitoba alumni
Living people
Year of birth missing (living people)